Riccardo Mazzetti (born  2 May 1984) is an Italian shooter. He represented his country at the 2016 Summer Olympics.

References 

1984 births
Living people
Italian male sport shooters
Shooters at the 2016 Summer Olympics
Olympic shooters of Italy
European Games competitors for Italy
Shooters at the 2019 European Games
Shooters at the 2020 Summer Olympics